Stutzia covillei, the arrow-scale or Coville's orach, is an annual plant in the amaranth family (Amaranthaceae) that grows in dry climates and deserts of the Southwestern United States. Formerly part of genus Atriplex and transferred to Stutzia in 2010.

References 

Chenopodioideae
Flora of the California desert regions
Plants described in 1918
Flora without expected TNC conservation status